Muscarella may refer to:

 Nicholas James (actor) (born Nicholas James Muscarella, active from 2006), American actor
 Oscar White Muscarella (born 1931), American archaeologist
 Muscarella, a junior synonym of Specklinia, a genus of orchids

See also
 Muscarelle Museum of Art, Virginia